Ankerbrua is a bridge located in the district of Grünerløkka in Oslo, Norway.

History
Ankerbrua was built over the Aker River (Akerselva) to serve as an extension of Torggata along Ankertorget with Søndre gate. The former wooden bridge was constructed in 1874. After several landslides on muddy terrain, it was demolished. It was replaced by the current structure in 1926, being made of Drammen granite from Røyken. The walls of the bridge have an irregular pattern and rough surface in the Art Nouveau style.

During plans to renovate the Grünerløkka borough in the 1960s, Ankerbrua was one of the few structures selected to be preserved.

The bridge has been nicknamed the Fairytale Bridge (Eventyrbrua) due to its four sculptures, one in each corner. These sculptures were designed by Norwegian sculptor and artist, Dyre Vaa. Cast from bronze in 1937, each figure represents a different Norwegian folk hero from Norwegian Folktales. 

The motifs are: 
White-Bear-King-Valemon (Kvitebjørn kong Valemon) - a king who was cursed to spend his days as a polar bear after he refused to marry a wicked witch.
Per Gynt  - a legendary deer hunter from Gudbrandsdalen.
Katie Woodencloak (Kari Trestakk) - who escaped her evil stepmother on the back of a great blue ox.
Veslefrikk med fela - a young man who gets three wishes from a troll.

References

External links
Peer Gynt statue by Dyre Vaa on Ankerbrua
 Kari Trestakk statue by Dyre Vaa on Ankerbrua
Kvitebjørn kong Valemon statue by Dyre Vaa on Ankerbrua
Ankerbrua  picture gallery

Grünerløkka
Bridges in Oslo
Akerselva
Bridges completed in 1926